HMS Kingfisher was a  screw sloop of the Royal Navy.  She was built at Sheerness Dockyard and launched on 16 December 1879.  She conducted anti-slavery work in the East Indies in the late 1880s before being re-roled as a training cruiser, being renamed HMS Lark on 10 November 1892, and then HMS Cruizer on 18 May 1893.  She was sold in 1919.

Design
The Doterel class were a development of the Osprey-class sloops and were of composite construction, with wooden hulls over an iron frame. The original 1874 design by the Chief Constructor, William Henry White was revised in 1877 by Sir Nathaniel Barnaby and nine were ordered. Of 1,130 tons displacement and approximately 1,100 indicated horsepower, they were capable of approximately 11 knots and were armed with two 7-inch muzzle loading rifled guns on pivoting mounts, and four 64-pound guns (two on pivoting mounts, and two broadside).  They had a complement of approximately 140 men.

Construction
Kingfisher was laid down at Sheerness Royal Dockyard in 1878 and launched on 16 December 1879. She was commissioned on 17 August 1880, and was classified as both a sloop of war and as a colonial cruiser. She was capable of attaining nearly  under full steam or 15 knots under sail.

History
The primary purpose of ships of the Kingfishers class was to maintain British naval dominance through trade protection, anti-slavery, and long-term surveying.

Anti slavery in the East Indies
Kingfisher served on the East Indies and Pacific Stations.  She recommissioned at Bombay on 8 Apr 1888.  Much of her time was spent conducting anti-slavery patrols out of Zanzibar.

Training ship
She was re-classified as a training ship on 10 November 1892, being renamed Lark.  She was renamed Cruizer on 18 May 1893.

In June 1902 she served in the Mediterranean under the command of Commander Francis William Kennedy. In 1913, she was serving as an accommodation ship at Malta.

Fate
She was sold in 1919.

References

External links 
 

 

Doterel-class sloops
Ships built in Sheerness
1879 ships
Victorian-era sloops of the United Kingdom